The Giardino Botanico Daniela Brescia (43,000 m2) is a botanical garden located in the Majella National Park (Parco Nazionale della Majella) at an altitude of 900 meters above sea level, Sant'Eufemia a Maiella, Abruzzo, Italy. It is open daily in the summer, and weekends otherwise.

The garden was established in 2000, and now contains almost 500 species including Achillea oxyloba, Cerastium tomentosum, Cymbalaria pallida, Genziana dinarica, and other species typical of Mount Majella. It contains reproductions of several environments in the central Apennine Mountains, including high altitude cliffs and screes, and the Majella National Park Herbarium.

See also 
 List of botanical gardens in Italy

References 
 

Daniela Brescia
2000 establishments in Italy
Gardens in Abruzzo